Athamanthia is an Eastern Palearctic genus of butterfly in the family Lycaenidae. Athamanthia is differentiated from Lycaena by characters of the male genitalia.

Species
 Athamanthia athamantis (Eversmann, 1854) Turan, Dzhungarsky Alatau
 Athamanthia rushanica Zhdanko, 1990 western Pamirs, Turan, Gissar Range
 Athamanthia sogdiana Zhdanko, 1990 southern Turkmenistan (Badhyz State Nature Reserve), southern Gissar Range
 Athamanthia churkini Zhdanko, 2000 Keke-Meren River, Kirghizia 1650 m
 Athamanthia phoenicura (Lederer, [1870]) Turkmenia (Kopet Dag), southern Armenia, Turkey, Iran, Azerbaijan, Afghanistan, Pakistan
 Athamanthia dimorpha (Staudinger, 1881) northern Iran, northern and western Tian-Shan, Dzhungarsky Alatau, Saur Mountains, Tarbagatai Mountains, southern Altay Mountains, Kazakhstan, Uzbekistan, southwestern Mongolia
 Athamanthia japhetica (Nekrutenko & Effendi, 1983) Azerbaijan
 Athamanthia issykkuli Zhdanko, 1990 Kyrgyzstan (Issyk-kul) 
 Athamanthia eitschbergeri Lukhtanov, 1993 Kyrgyzstan (Issyk-Kul lake)
 Athamanthia namanganica Lukhtanov, 2000 Kyrgyzstan (Tschatkal, western Tian Shan)
 Athamanthia zhdankoi Lukhtanov, 2000 Kyrgyzstan (Sarykamysch Mountains) 1600 m 
 Athamanthia dilutior (Staudinger, 1881) Kyrgyzstan
 Athamanthia alexandra (Püngeler, 1901) Uzbekistan (Nuratau Mountains), Syr Darya, Dzhungarsky Alatau

References

Lycaeninae
Lycaenidae genera